Babayevo is the name of several inhabited localities in Russia.

Modern localities
Urban localities
Babayevo (town), Vologda Oblast, a town in Babayevsky District of Vologda Oblast

Rural localities
Babayevo, Kaltasinsky District, Republic of Bashkortostan, a village in Kalmiyabashevsky Selsoviet of Kaltasinsky District in the Republic of Bashkortostan
Babayevo, Mishkinsky District, Republic of Bashkortostan, a selo in Kameyevsky Selsoviet of Mishkinsky District in the Republic of Bashkortostan
Babayevo, Maloyaroslavetsky District, Kaluga Oblast, a village in Maloyaroslavetsky District of Kaluga Oblast
Babayevo, Yukhnovsky District, Kaluga Oblast, a village in Yukhnovsky District of Kaluga Oblast
Babayevo, Kostroma Oblast, a village in Voskresenskoye Settlement of Nerekhtsky District in Kostroma Oblast; 
Babayevo, Mozhaysky District, Moscow Oblast, a village in Yurlovskoye Rural Settlement of Mozhaysky District in Moscow Oblast; 
Babayevo, Ruzsky District, Moscow Oblast, a settlement in Staroruzskoye Rural Settlement of Ruzsky District in Moscow Oblast; 
Babayevo, Pskov Oblast, a village in Pskovsky District of Pskov Oblast
Babayevo, Tver Oblast, a village in Ploskoshskoye Rural Settlement of Toropetsky District in Tver Oblast
Babayevo, Vladimir Oblast, a selo in Sobinsky District of Vladimir Oblast
Babayevo (rural locality), Vologda Oblast, a village in Volodinsky Selsoviet of Babayevsky District in Vologda Oblast
Babayevo, Bolsheselsky District, Yaroslavl Oblast, a village in Blagoveshchensky Rural Okrug of Bolsheselsky District in Yaroslavl Oblast
Babayevo, Danilovsky District, Yaroslavl Oblast, a village in Babayevsky Rural Okrug of Danilovsky District in Yaroslavl Oblast
Babayevo, Nekouzsky District, Yaroslavl Oblast, a village in Shestikhinsky Rural Okrug of Nekouzsky District in Yaroslavl Oblast
Babayevo, Uglichsky District, Yaroslavl Oblast, a village in Ilyinsky Rural Okrug of Uglichsky District in Yaroslavl Oblast

Alternative names
Babayevo, alternative name of Babeyevo, a selo in Babeyevsky Selsoviet of Temnikovsky District in the Republic of Mordovia; 
Babayevo, alternative name of Babeyevo, a village in Stepanovskoye Rural Settlement of Noginsky District in Moscow Oblast;